The Columbus Avenue Line is a public transit line in Manhattan, New York City, running mostly along Columbus Avenue, 116th Street, and Lenox Avenue from Lower Manhattan to Harlem. Originally a streetcar line, it is now the M7 bus route, operated by the New York City Transit Authority, a division of the Metropolitan Transportation Authority.

Route description
The M7 route begins at the intersection of Sixth Avenue and 14th Street. Northbound it shares Sixth Avenue with the M55 between 14th Street and 44th Street, as well as the M5 above 31st Street. Southbound it shares Seventh Avenue with the M20. The M7 turns west at 59th Street and northwest on Broadway to reach the one-way pair of Amsterdam Avenue (northbound) and Columbus Avenue (southbound). These two streets are shared with the M11. The M7 turns east at 106th Street, north on Manhattan Avenue, east on 116th Street, and north on Lenox Avenue to a loop at the 145th Street subway station. This is the exact path followed by the former streetcar north of 109th Street.

Prior to 2009, southbound M7 service ran along Broadway and terminated at Union Square along 14th Street. This was changed due to pedestrianization of Broadway at Times Square, Duffy Square, and Herald Square, which closed the street to traffic. The southbound M7 now turns left at 14th Street and terminates at Sixth Avenue and 14th Street.

History

The Ninth Avenue Railroad's Ninth Avenue Line used the southernmost part of Columbus Avenue, but cut over along Broadway to use Amsterdam Avenue to Harlem. On December 30, 1892, the Columbus and Ninth Avenue Railroad acquired a franchise from the city to build along Columbus Avenue from Broadway to 110th Street, with a branch west on 106th Street to Amsterdam Avenue. It was soon authorized to build in 109th Street and Manhattan Avenue to 116th Street. The company was consolidated into the Metropolitan Street Railway on November 7, 1895.

Columbus Avenue cars were operated by the Metropolitan along their Broadway Line from lower Manhattan to Midtown, and then along the 53rd Street Crosstown Line (later the 59th Street Crosstown Line) west to 9th Avenue/Columbus Avenue. Cable cars were used from the line's opening on December 6, 1894 until May 1901. After the Metropolitan system was split in 1913, and the Third Avenue Railway acquired the 59th Street Crosstown, 53rd Street was again used.

Buses were substituted for streetcars by the New York City Omnibus Corporation on March 25, 1936. In 1956 it was renamed Fifth Avenue Coach Lines, and the Manhattan and Bronx Surface Transit Operating Authority replaced it in 1962. When Columbus and Amsterdam Avenues became one-way streets, northbound buses were moved to Amsterdam Avenue.

Pedestrianization of Broadway in Times Square and Herald Square in 2009 led to southbound buses using 7th Avenue instead of Broadway from 59th Street to 14th Street. Consequently, the 14th Street terminus was shifted to 6th Avenue. 

On November 28, 2018, the route's southern terminal was moved to 18th Street and Sixth Avenue. Southbound buses began to run on 16th Street to reach the terminal. As of 2020, the M7 has been restored to 14th Street and Sixth Avenue.

References

External links
 

Streetcar lines in Manhattan
1892 introductions
M007
007
Sixth Avenue
Seventh Avenue (Manhattan)